Alum Sandra Ogwang (born 2 December 1972) is a Ugandan social scientist, politician and legislator. She represents the people of Oyam District as district Woman representative in the Parliament of Uganda. She is a member of the Uganda People's Congress ( UPC), a party under the chairmanship of Jimmy Akena, who is the member of parliament for Lira municipality and son to former president Apollo Milton Obote.

Education 
Alum started her primary education from Anai primary school where she sat her primary leaving examinations (PLE) in 1987. She thereafter enrolled at Ikwera girls secondary school for her O'level education where she completed her Uganda Certificate of Education (UCE) in 1990. She then joined Bombo senior secondary school for her A'level education where she completed her Uganda Advanced Certificate of Education (UACE) in 1994. She attended Makerere University where she graduated with a bachelor's degree in library and information science in 1998. She later added a master's degree in gender studies in 2010 from the same university.

Career 
Alum serves as director/secretary of Sysplus Limited from 1998 to date. From 2005 to 2006 she was a data entrant at Makerere University She was also a member of Oyam District public accounts committee from 2006 to 2010. In 1998 she was a teacher at Almond College, Lira.

She is a member of Parliament of Uganda from 2011 to present. In parliament she is the Uganda People's Congress (UPC) party whip and she also serves on the Business Committee and the Committee on Agriculture. She is also a member of the Uganda Women Parliamentary Association (UWOPA).

Alum Santa is a member of the Uganda parliamentary forum on social protection (UPFSP) a forum that advocates for social protection especially the most vulnerable sections of Uganda's population.

See also 

 Parliament of Uganda
 List of members of the ninth Parliament of Uganda
 List of members of the tenth Parliament of Uganda
 Oyam District
 Charles Okello Engola
 Ongom Amongi Betty

External links 

 Website of the Parliament of Uganda

References 

1972 births
Living people
Members of the Parliament of Uganda
Women members of the Parliament of Uganda
Uganda People's Congress politicians
Oyam District
People from Oyam District
21st-century Ugandan politicians
21st-century Ugandan women politicians